Alien Encounters is a science fiction mini series on the Science Channel. The series explores how humanity might react to first-contact with aliens. The fictional series is presented as a documentary intermixed with commentary from scientists and sci-fi writers. The series begins with an alien signal detected by the SETI Institute and follows through alien contact and the creation of hybrids ("Brids") based on alien DNA.

Episodes
The series had the following episodes:

Season 1 
There are 2 episodes in the first season.

Season 2
There are 2 episodes in the second season.

Season 3 
There are 6 episodes in season three.

Recurring Commentators 
Recurring commentators included:

 Anthony D. Call - Narrator
 Ariel Anbar - Director, ASU Astrobiology Program
 Jeffrey L. Bada - Distinguished Professor of Marine Chemistry, UCSD
 David Brin - Astronomer, Author, NASA Consultant
 Paul Davies - Physicist, Director of the Beyond Center at Arizona State University
 Alan Dean Foster - Author
 David Gerrold - Author, Screen Writer
 Kevin R. Grazier - Planetary Scientist
 Alex Lightman - Author, Entrepreneur, Futurist
 Malcolm Maciver - Neuroscientist, Mechanical Engineer, Northwestern University
 Hakeem Oluseyi - Astrophysicist, Florida Tech
 Nick Sagan - Author
 John Scalzi - Author
 Seth Shostak - Astronomer, SETI Institute
 Joan Slonczewski - Microbiologist, Author
 Jill Tarter - Author, SETI Institute
 Neil deGrasse Tyson -  Astrophysicist, author, and Director of the Hayden Planetarium
 Douglas Vakoch - Psychologist, SETI Institute

See also
 Astrobiology
 Cultural impact of extraterrestrial contact
 First contact (science fiction)
 SETI@home

References

External links 

 
 

Television series about extraterrestrial life
Science Channel original programming